Buddhism is a small minority religion in the Netherlands, but it has shown rapid growth in recent years. As of the 2006 estimate, 170,000 Dutch people identified their religion as Buddhist (about 1% of the total population).

Early history
The first awareness of Buddhism in the Netherlands can be traced back to early books, with references to Buddhism reappearing in 1651, 1843 and 1878, with the first book on Buddhism being written in the Dutch language in 1879. The turn of the century saw more popular books on Buddhism published in Dutch.

Academic study of Buddhism in the Netherlands
The scientific study of Buddhism began in the Netherlands with the appointment of Hendrik Kern as the first professor for the chair for Sanskrit at Leiden University. He published two histories and a manual of Buddhism. Kern, like Émile Senart, portrayed the Buddha as a legendary being or a hero representing the sun. Kern was succeeded by Jacob Speyer (1849–1913), who translated several Mahayana texts and the Jatakamala for the series ‘The Sacred Books of the Buddhists’. The subsequent chair, Jean Philippe Vogel (1871–1958), became famous as an archaeologist by proving that Kasia in India must have been Kusinara, the place of the Parinirvana of the Buddha. He also conducted investigations on the Borobudur, the great Buddhist monument on the Isle of Java.

Postwar Buddhism
After the Second World War, a strong ally for Buddhism came in the form of the Theosophists. The Dutch secretary of the Theosophical Society Adyar, Mrs. Spruitenburg, returned from India and started ‘gatherings’ in her home in Huizen that attracted dozens of people from all over the country. Among them was Ernst Verwaal, who founded the ‘Buddhistische Vriendenkring Den Haag’ (Circle of Friends of Buddhism The Hague), later renamed as ‘Nederlandse Buddhistische Vriendenkring’ (Dutch Circle of Friends of Buddhism). He issued a simple journal. The centre of the ‘Circle’ was in The Hague, where in 1966 the wife of the Thai Ambassador, Mrs. Bhakdi, started receiving on Saturdays its members in the Thai Embassy. Later the group was presided by Ronald Poelmeijer, also being influenced by Peter van der Beek, who in 1953 became a member of The Western Buddhist Order, represented in Europe by the British Buddhist Jack Austin.

National Buddhist Organisation
In 1966 the Dutch Circle of Friends of Buddhism Circle changed its name to the ‘Buddhist Society in the Netherlands’. The new Society held activities that were calculated liberal to all the schools of Buddhism. This ecumenical policy led to some dissension, and later the organization was revamped as the ‘Stichting Nederlands Buddhistisch Centrum’ (Dutch Buddhist Centre Foundation) on 8 November 1967, with the aim ‘to study of the principles of Buddhism in all its diversity and to encourage the practical application of these principles. From 1968 to the present, the Centre has issued a journal. Originally it was called ‘Saddharma’ and early in the 21st century it was rechristened as ‘Vorm en Leegte’ and published together with a commercial Buddhist publisher. The centre changed its name in 1978 to ‘Stichting Vrienden van het Boeddhisme’ (Friends of Buddhism Foundation). In the same year the ‘Boeddhistische Unie van Nederland’ (Buddhist Union of the Netherlands) was founded, consisting only of representatives of Buddhist groups, with Tony Kurpershoek-Scherft as its first President. It was this second organization which became the Dutch member of the European Buddhist Union. Early 21st century however it dropped its membership of the EBU for a number of reasons; a main one being that the EBU had, and currently still has, both national umbrella organisations amongst its members as well as 'traditions on European level' like FPMT, Triratna Buddhist Community etc. making it in the BUN's eyes a too confused platform.

From 1978 onwards, the history of Buddhism in the Netherlands is mostly the story of individual Buddhist traditions. With however the BUN still acting on their behalf towards government and NGOs, leading to e.g. the BOS 'Boeddhistische Omroep Stichting' (Buddhist Broadcasting Channel) and the formal Buddhist Prisoner Chaplainship which gets equal recognition as other religions. And the SVB still being relevant as an ecumenical entry-level organisation, and as publisher of the only generic Buddhist (quarterly) magazine available in Dutch kiosks.

Zen/Chán Buddhism

In 1968 Leo Boer and Janwillem van de Wetering founded a Zen group, and through two books  made Zen popular in the Netherlands. The guidance of the group was taken over by Erik Bruijn who is still in charge of a flourishing community.

There are several Zen organisations in the Netherlands:
 The Kanzeon Sangha of Genpo Roshi – having its roots in the White Plum Asanga of Taizan Maezumi Roshi – consists of several organisations:
 Niko Tydeman Sensei leads the Zen Centrum Amsterdam, which has a relatively large zendo in the centre of Amsterdam. 
 Tenkei Coppens Roshi leads the Zen River Buddhist monastery in Uithuizen.
 Ton Lathouwers is the informal "leader" of Maha Karuna Ch’an, an … informal and fundamentally open sangha of laypersons …. Ton studied under several teachers, beginning with Masao Abe. He received dharma transmission from the Indonesian Chán teacher Teh Cheng. Ton's teachings are characterised by an emphasises on karuna.
 Another group consists of the Zen.nl organisation from Rients Ritskes, a student of Hirata Roshi of Tenryū-ji in Kyoto. He studied in Kyoto in 1986/87, and claimed to be "officially authorised" by Sokun Tsushimoto Roshi in 1999.
 Many other groups are also represented in the Netherlands, like the Order of Buddhist Contemplatives in Apeldoorn, the Thich Nhat Hanh Order of Interbeing and the International Zen Institute Noorderpoort monastery/retreat centre in Drenthe, led by Jiun Hogen Roshi.
 Chinese Buddhists developed an own centre: it is a famous landmark in the Chinatown district of Amsterdam, called the He Hua temple. It's manned primarily by monks and nuns linked to the BLIA of Ven. Hsing Yun from Taiwan.

Theravada Buddhism
In 1971 the Dutch merchant Monshouwer gathered some people in order to discuss the possibility of founding a Theravada temple with the support of Thai ambassador Sompong Sucharitkul. In 1973 the temple was officially founded in Waalwijk. Originally the temple was named Wat Dhammasucaritanucharee, but two years later renamed as Buddharama Temple with its own supporting foundation called ‘Young Buddhists Netherlands’. This foundation had its own journal. Later the founding abbot Ven. Mettavihari moved to Amsterdam and started a separate community of vipassana practitioners there. The foundation supporting the Thai temple in Waalwijk was renamed the ‘Nederlandse Buddha Dhamma Stichting’ (Dutch Buddha Dhamma Foundation) and now aims mainly for Thai immigrants.

In 2015 it became known that Mettavihari had sexually abused various of his followers in Waalwijk and elsewhere. At least 21 victims had accused him of abuse by June 2015.

After the passing away of Ven. Mettavihari, there still is the Sangha Metta Buddhist temple in Amsterdam centre; next to this two countrywide organisations being the general Vipassana-oriented SIM  and the Burmese-oriented Sagya U Bha Khin . Also more regional organisations exist e.g. around Groningen and Drenthe in the north of the country.

Tibetan Buddhism
In 1977 Han de Wit, an authorized pupil of the Kagyu lama Chogyam Trungpa, founded a centre in Amsterdam  which is engaged in teaching the Dharma and meditation according to Tibetan tradition. There is a smaller centre in Oegstgeest, also founded by de Wit, and groups in two other towns (Utrecht and Nijmegen). Other Karma Kagyu centres from different lineages have also sprung up, e.g. Naropa Institute in Cadzand, the locally famous Stupa temple in Hantum and Diamond Way Buddhism (Ole Nydahl).
The Tibetan Nyingma tradition is represented by several groups. They have a centre (Nyingma Centrum, Nederland) and a bookshop in Amsterdam. These groups belong to the organization of Tarthang Tulku who resides in California. The Gelugpa tradition (FPMT) is organized in the Maitreya Institute and owns a retreat centre in Loenen, Apeldoorn and a city centre in Amsterdam. The Maitreya Institute centres here are based on the initiative of Paula Koolkin in 1976. In August 1979 lama Thubten Yeshe and lama Zopa Rinpoche came to teach. By 2013 lama Geshe Sonam Gyaltsen and lama Sonam Ngodrup are the teachers in permanent residence. The Sakya tradition of Tibetan Buddhism took a foothold in 1976 as Geshe Lama Sherab Gyaltsen Amipa established the ‘Sakya Thegchen Ling’ in The Hague. 
Next to these four main schools there are also representations of more ecumenic and split-off Tibetan Groups. E.g. Rigpa from Sogyal Rinpoche, Dzogchen community from Chogyal Namkhai Norbu, the New Kadampa Tradition and the Jewel Heart affiliated with Gelek Rinpoche.

Other groups
Finally two more ecumenic groups should be mentioned. In the first place the Triratna Buddhist Community (TBC, formerly FWBO) connected with the large movement of Ven. Sangharakshita in the UK. It is growing at a regular speed, with centres in Amsterdam and Arnhem and a retreat centre in Hengstdijk, in the southern Zeelandic Flanders region. The centre in The Hague, 'Boeddhistisch Centrum Haaglanden', follows roughly the same teaching but separated from the movement. Secondly there is the Arya Maitreya Mandala, a group of pupils of Lama Anagarika Govinda. This group had separated itself from the larger group in Germany after the death of Lama Govinda.

Present situation

In 1971 there were 900 Buddhists in the Netherlands. Since 1971 the number of Buddhists has increased considerably, probably in connection with the rise of ‘alternative’ views in society and the decline of Christianity. The increased interest in Buddhism is evident from the growth in number of Buddhist centres. In 1990 total there were forty-two groups., in 2010 between eighty and one hundred including groups associated with a larger national centre. A Buddhist broadcasting channel (Boeddhistische Omroep Stichting) offers programming on the national network. In 2004 there were 170,000 Buddhists in the Netherlands - about 1% of the population. Also the Buddhist Prison Chaplainship, 'Boeddhistische Zendende Instantie', is formally recognised by the government, gets equal subsidy as the other main religions and is busy setting up a professional training in cooperation with the Free University of Amsterdam.

References

Further reading
 Boer, I. den, Boeddhisme in Nederland’, Saddharma, 19(2), 19(4), 20(1).
 Janssen, R. H. C., "Buddhism in the Netherlands: History and Present Status", in: Buddhism into the Year 2.000. International Conference Proceedings (First International Conference 'Buddhism into the Year 2000', hosted by the Dhammakaaya Foundation, Bangkok (Thailand), February 8, 1990), Bangkok: Dhammakaya Foundation 1995, pp. 151–156
 Gemert, Victor van, Boeddhisme in Nederland, 1990, 
 Poorthuis, Marcel; Salemink, Theo, Lotus in de Lage Landen: De geschiedenis van het boeddhisme in Nederland - Beeldvorming van 1840 tot heden, Uitgever Parthenon, Almere, 

 
Netherlands
Religion in the Netherlands
Lit